The Evelyn tables are a set of four anatomical preparations on wooden boards that are thought to be the oldest anatomical preparations in Europe.  They were acquired by John Evelyn in Padua in 1646 and later donated by Evelyn to the Royal Society.  They are currently owned by the Royal College of Surgeons, and displayed there at the Hunterian Museum in London.  Six similar tables are held by Royal College of Physicians, brought to London from Italy by John Finch.

Each table displays a different part of the human body - arteries, nerves, veins - dissected out from a human specimen and glued to a wooden board made from pine planks, planed and glued together, with the whole covered with several coats of varnish. The first table displays the spinal cord and nerves; the second shows the aorta and the arteries; the third shows the vagi and sympathetic nerves, and the veins of the lungs and the liver; and the fourth shows the distribution of the veins.

Evelyn spent several years outside England in the 1640s, during the English Civil War.  His Diary records a visit to Padua in March 1646 to view dissection lectures at the University of Padua, when he acquired the four tables (a later letter reports the price as 150 scudi).  Three of the tables (arteries, nerves, veins) were prepared by Giovanni Leoni d'Este (died 1649), dissector to Professor of Anatomy in Padua, Johann Vesling (1598-1649), for Leoni's own use.  The fourth (vagi, lungs, liver) was prepared by Leoni at Evelyn's request.  Evelyn travelled on, eventually returning to London.  His diary also records the arrival of the tables in London in April 1649 (the journey via Venice having been delayed in Holland) and his donation of the tables to the nascent Royal Society in October 1667, which displayed them in the "repository" (museum) in the west gallery of Gresham College on Bishopsgate from 1674.   A paper on the tables of arteries and veins was presented by William Cowper on 21 January 1701 and later printed in Philosophical Transactions, with his drawings engraved by Michael van der Gucht.

After a move to a new location in Crane Court, off Fleet Street, the tables were acquired by the rapidly expanding British Museum in June 1781, and then bought by the Royal College of Surgeons in 1809.

References

Further reading
Images of  the Evelyn Tables can be found on SurgiCat (the Royal College of Surgeons).
"John Evelyn's tables of veins and arteries: a rediscovered letter.", R.K. Aspin, Med Hist. 1995 October; 39(4): 493–499.
"An Account of Divers Schemes of Arteries and Veins, Dissected from Adult Human Bodies, and Given to the Repository of the Royal Society by John Evelyn, Esq; E. R. S. To Which are Subjoyn'd a Description of the Extremities of Those Vessels, and the Manner the Blood is Seen, by the Microscope, to Pass from the Arteries to the Veins in Quadrupeds When Living: With Some Chirurgical Observations, and Figures after the Life, by William Cowper, F. R. S." Phil. Trans. 1702 23:1177-1201  

Human anatomy